Dzianis Jaŭhienavič Ivashyn (also Dzyanis Ivashyn, Denis Ivashin; ; ; born 6 June 1979, Hrodna, USSR) is a Belarusian journalist. He works as a freelance correspondent of Belarusian Novy Chas newspaper and a volunteer investigator of the Ukrainian Inform Napalm project. He was arrested in 2021 by the Belarusian KGB and charged with high treason. His colleagues believe that this arrest was connected with his publications about former Ukrainian Berkut members employed by the Belarusian police.

Journalist
Ivashyn participated in the 2014 Euromaidan in Ukraine, and later that year he entered the Ukrainian investigative project Inform Napalm as an editor of its Belarusian edition. In 2018, he became a freelance correspondent of Novy Chas newspaper. His main publications were dedicated to the foreign influence of Russia in Belarus and Syria, commercial development near the Kuropaty mass grave of the 1930s' Great Purge in the Soviet Union, and employment of former Ukrainian Berkut members by the Belarusian police. In 2017, he was sentenced to 5 days of prison for committing journalism at the Freedom Day meeting.

On 12 March 2021, Ivashyn was detained in Hrodna by the Belarusian KGB. His detention happened soon after he published an article about Berkut members in the Belarusian OMON. According to Ivashyn, who claimed to use only open source material, more than 10 former Berkut members who had left Ukraine served in Belarusian OMON as soldiers, ensigns and officers. He claimed that granting Belarusian citizenship to them and recruitment to police involved legal violations, and stated that several former Berkut members participated in the suppression of the 2020 Belarusian protests.

Originally, Ivashyn was charged under article 365 of the Belarusian Criminal Code ("Interference in the activities of a police officer"). On 30 October 2021, it was uncovered that he was also charged under article 356 ("High treason"). His lawyer signed a nondisclosure agreement preventing him from disclosing information about the inquiry. Ivashyn was placed in the punishment cell at least 5 times (30 days). According to his wife, he had a stroke during his second stay in the punishment cell. His relatives claim that his right to correspond was artificially restricted by the prison manager.

On 24 March 2021, 8 Belarusian human rights organizations recognized Ivashyn as a political prisoner and called for his immediate release. European Federation of Journalists demanded immediate release of Ivashyn. Seán Haughey, Irish member of Parliament, became a "godfather" (sponsor) of Ivashyn.

References

External links
 

1979 births
Living people
Belarusian journalists
Belarusian political prisoners
Political prisoners according to Viasna Human Rights Centre